Youngsville is a borough in Warren County, Pennsylvania, United States. The population was 1,729 at the 2010 census.

Geography
Youngsville is located at  (41.853460, -79.318614).

According to the United States Census Bureau, the borough has a total area of 1.3 square miles (3.4 km2), all  land.

Demographics

As of the census of 2000, there were 1,834 people, 767 households, and 533 families living in the borough. The population density was 1,380.3 people per square mile (532.4/km2). There were 821 housing units at an average density of 617.9 per square mile (238.3/km2). The racial makeup of the borough was 99.13% White, 0.38% Native American, 0.05% Asian, 0.16% from other races, and 0.27% from two or more races. Hispanic or Latino of any race were 0.60% of the population.

There were 767 households, out of which 31.4% had children under the age of 18 living with them, 53.8% were married couples living together, 11.5% had a female householder with no husband present, and 30.5% were non-families. 27.0% of all households were made up of individuals, and 13.7% had someone living alone who was 65 years of age or older. The average household size was 2.39 and the average family size was 2.89.

In the borough the population was spread out, with 25.5% under the age of 18, 6.3% from 18 to 24, 25.7% from 25 to 44, 25.3% from 45 to 64, and 17.2% who were 65 years of age or older. The median age was 40 years. For every 100 females there were 87.0 males. For every 100 females age 18 and over, there were 86.4 males.

The median income for a household in the borough was $32,104, and the median income for a family was $40,185. Males had a median income of $32,778 versus $20,380 for females. The per capita income for the borough was $16,278. About 10.2% of families and 11.9% of the population were below the poverty line, including 20.7% of those under age 18 and 10.3% of those age 65 or over.

Notable people
Guy Hecker, major league baseball pitcher, threw a no-hitter
LouAnne Johnson, writer, teacher and former United States Marine
Walter Sheffer, photographer and teacher
Michael Shine, former United States Olympic athlete

References

Boroughs in Warren County, Pennsylvania
Populated places established in 1796
1796 establishments in Pennsylvania